Filip Hronek (born 2 November 1997) is a Czech professional ice hockey defenceman for the Vancouver Canucks of the National Hockey League (NHL). Hronek previously played in the NHL for the Detroit Red Wings. He was drafted 53rd overall by the Red Wings in the 2016 NHL Entry Draft.

Playing career
Hronek made his Czech Extraliga debut with Mountfield HK during the 2014–15 season. During the 2015–16 season, he recorded no goals and four assists in 40 games.

On 14 July 2016, the Detroit Red Wings signed Hronek to a three-year, entry-level contract. Following the completion of the 2016–17 OHL season, Hronek was assigned to the Grand Rapids Griffins on 22 March 2017. In his first season in North America, Hronek recorded 14 goals and 47 assists in 59 games for the Saginaw Spirit. He was tied for fourth among OHL defenceman in scoring with 61 points, and was among the team's leaders with 47 assists (1st), 21 power play points (1st), 14 goals (4th) and 235 shots (2nd) and was named the Spirits' Best Defenceman, and Most Valuable Player.

He made his NHL debut for the Red Wings on 4 October 2018. On 13 October 2018, Hronek scored his first career NHL goal against Tuukka Rask of the Boston Bruins. During the 2018–19 season, Hronek recorded five goals and 18 assists in 46 games for the Red Wings. His 23 points led all Red Wings rookies, and ranked fourth in NHL scoring by a rookie defenceman. He finished the season on a four-game point streak, the longest point streak by a Red Wings rookie defenceman since 1991–92, and posted seven total points in his last six games. Following the completion of the Red Wings' season, he was re-assigned to the Griffins. Hronek was named the 2019 Red Wings Rookie of the Year in voting conducted by Detroit Sports Media.

On 28 August 2020, having returned to his native Czech Republic through the off-season and during the COVID-19 pandemic, Hronek joined former club, Mountfield HK of the ELH on loan until the commencement of the delayed 2020–21 North American season.

On 3 September 2021, Hronek signed a three-year, $13.2 million contract with the Red Wings. On 1 March 2023, Hronek was traded to the Vancouver Canucks, along with a fourth-round pick in the 2023 NHL Entry Draft in exchange for a first-round and second-round pick in the 2023 NHL Entry Draft. Prior to being traded, Hronek appeared in 60 games with the Red Wings during the 2022–23 season, where he recorded nine goals, 29 assists, four power play goals, 16 power play points, 122 shots and 21:32 average time on ice.

International play

Hronek captained Czech Republic at the 2017 World Junior Ice Hockey Championships, where he was the team's leading defenceman with two goals and two assists in five games.

Hronek also represented the Czech Republic at the 2018 and 2019 World Hockey Championships. At the 2019 World Championships, Hronek led the tournament in points for a defenceman, was selected for the tournament All-Star Team, and was awarded Best Defenceman.

Career statistics

Regular season and playoffs

International

Awards and honours

References

External links
 

1997 births
Living people
Czech expatriate ice hockey players in the United States
Czech ice hockey defencemen
Detroit Red Wings draft picks
Detroit Red Wings players
Grand Rapids Griffins players
HC Stadion Litoměřice players
Saginaw Spirit players
Sportspeople from Hradec Králové
Stadion Hradec Králové players